The women's high jump event at the 2016 IAAF World U20 Championships was held at Zdzisław Krzyszkowiak Stadium on 22 and 24 July.

Medalists

Records

Results

Qualification
Qualification: 1.84 (Q) or at least 12 best performers (q) qualified for the final.

Final

References

High jump
High jump at the World Athletics U20 Championships